Stade Rue de Lenningen is a football stadium in Canach, in south-eastern Luxembourg.

It is currently the home stadium of FC Jeunesse Canach.  The stadium has a capacity of 1,000.

References

Rue Lenningen